Tina Chancey is a multi-instrumentalist specializing in early bowed strings from the rebec and vielle to the kamenj, renaissance fiddle, violas da gamba and pardessus de viole.

Early life and education
Born in Cleveland, Ohio to Communist parents, Chancey went into music at an early age, and attended Oberlin College. After three years at Oberlin, which had little early music in 1967-70, she moved to New York City to continue her education. She received her Bachelor's in Music and MA in performance from Queens College, City University of New York, her MA in Musicology from New York University, and her PhD in Musicology from the online Union Institute.

Career
After 10 years in New York City with the Ensemble for Early Music and the New York Renaissance Band, she moved to Washington, DC and married Scott Reiss. She performed with the Folger Consort and started Hesperus, an early-traditional ensemble, with Scott in 1979. HESPERUS performed throughout the Far East, Latin America, Europe and the States, specializing in British and Spanish Colonial Music and Medieval & Appalachian Fusion. The group has 15 CDs and 6 DVDs to its credit.

Chancey is a specialist on the pardessus de viole (a 5-string hybrid viol/violin played on the lap during the 18th c.), and received two grants from the National Endowment for the Arts to support solo performances on the pardessus de viole at the Kennedy Center and Weill Recital Hall at Carnegie Hall. She has seven pardessus recordings; solos, a duo CD with Catharina Meints, and three with Trio Pardessus. Chancey currently performs a variety of early music styles with HESPERUS and Sephardic music with Trio Sefardi. Besides performing, she produces recordings for herself and others, teaches musical skills and improvisation, writes scholarly and popular articles, and directs HESPERUS, which is currently known for its early music soundtracks to classic silent films such as The Mark of Zorro, The Hunchback of Notre Dame, Nosferatu, Häxan and The Cabinet of Dr. Caligari.

Chancey has also performed with Ensemble Lucidarium, Ex Umbris, Ensemble Toss the Feathers and the Ensemble for Early Music.

In addition, she has written articles for publications such as Early Music America Magazine, as a book reviewer.

Chancey has also been a member of the Renaissance-Rock group Blackmore's Night (featuring Ritchie Blackmore of Deep Purple and Rainbow with his partner, Candice Night). Her stage name with them is "Tudor Rose."

Discography

HESPERUS, Tina Chancey & Scott Reiss 

 Food of Love - Renaissance instrumental music from the British Isles. 
 My Thing is My Own-Bawdy songs from D'Urfee's Pills to Purge Melancholy
 Dancing Day - Early and traditional Christmas music from around the world. 
 Baroque Recorder Concerti - Concertos by Telemann, Vivaldi, Graupner, Naudot, and Babel featuring Scott Reiss as recorder soloist.
 Spain in the New World - renaissance and baroque music from Old and New Spain
 Celtic Roots - with Bonnie Rideout and William Taylor 
 Luminous Spirit -Chants of Hildegard von Bingen with Rosa Lamoreaux
 I Love Lucette - 16th c. songs from the French secular theater, featuring Jane Hershey, Howard Bass and Rosa Lamoreaux 
 Unicorn - Early/Traditional Crossover with Bruce Molsky and Bruce Hutton
 Neo-Medieval - Scott Reiss, Grant Herreid, Tina Chancey
 The Duo Guersan--Tina Chancey and Catharina Meints on two five-string pardessus de viole.
 Early American Roots- British Colonial
 Patchwork- Reprint of For No Good Reason at All
 Colonial America-More British Colonial
 The Banshee's Wail--Scott Reiss, medieval and Irish fusion with Glen Velez, Zan McLeod, Tina Chancey
 Fêtes Galantes - Music for various numbers of pardessus with Joanna Blendulf, Annalisa Pappano, Tina Chancey, Catharina Meints, John Mark Rozendaal and Webb Wiggins

For silent film scores please visit : Hesperusplayszorro.com

As producer 
 Vivat Rex!: Sacred Choral Music of Jean Mouton. Suspicious Cheese Lords, 2008

References

External links 
 Tina Chancey's website
Extended concert announcement from Cornell paper
Hesperus at the Kennedy Center, includes video of performances.

Blackmore's Night members
Year of birth missing (living people)
Living people
Queens College, City University of New York alumni
New York University alumni
Union Institute & University alumni
College of William & Mary faculty
Viol players